Wedler is a German language habitational surname. Notable people with the name include:
 Gerd Wedler (1929–2008), German chemist
 Henry Wedler, American chemist and entrepreneur
 Luna Wedler (1999), Swiss actress
 Weronika Wedler (1989), Polish sprint athlete

German-language surnames
German toponymic surnames